The 2002 All-Ireland Senior Hurling Championship (known for sponsorship reasons as the Guinness Hurling Championship 2002) was the 116th staging of Ireland's premier hurling knock-out competition. Kilkenny won the championship, beating Clare 2-20 to 0-19 in the final at Croke Park, Dublin.

The championship

Format

Leinster Championship

First round: (3 matches) These are three games between six of the 'weaker' teams drawn from the province of Leinster.  Three teams are eliminated at this stage while the three winning teams advance to the second round.

Second round: (2 matches) The three winners of the first-round games join a fourth Leinster team to make up the second round pairings.  Two teams are eliminated at this stage while the two winning teams advance to the quarter-final.

Quarter-final: (1 match) This is a lone match between the first two teams drawn from the province of Munster.  One team is eliminated from the provincial championship at this stage while the winning team advances to the semi-finals.

Semi-finals: (2 matches) The winners of the lone quarter-final join the other three Leinster teams to make up the semi-final pairings.  Two teams are eliminated from the provincial championship at this stage while the two winning teams advance to the final.

Final: (1 match) The winners of the two semi-finals contest the Leinster final.  The runners-up advance to the All-Ireland qualifiers while the winners advance to the All-Ireland semi-final.

Munster Championship

Quarter-final: (1 match) This is a lone match between the first two teams drawn from the province of Munster.  One team is eliminated from the provincial championship at this stage while the winning team advances to the semi-finals.

Semi-finals: (2 matches) The winners of the lone quarter-final join the other three Munster teams to make up the semi-final pairings.  Two teams are eliminated from the provincial championship at this stage while the two winning teams advance to the final.

Final: (1 match) The winners of the two semi-finals contest the Munster final.  The runners-up advance to the All-Ireland qualifiers while the winners advance to the All-Ireland semi-final.

Ulster Championship

Quarter-final: (1 match) This is a lone match between the first two teams drawn from the province of Ulster.  One team is eliminated at this stage while the winning team advances to the semi-finals.

Semi-finals: (2 matches) The winners of the lone quarter-final join the other three Ulster teams to make up the semi-final pairings.  Two teams are eliminated at this stage while the two winning teams advance to the final.

Final: (1 match) The winners of the two semi-finals contest the Ulster final.  The runners-up advance to the All-Ireland qualifiers while the winners advance to the All-Ireland quarter-final.

Qualifiers

The qualifiers gives teams defeated in the provincial championships another chance at winning the All-Ireland.

Round 1: (4 matches) This round involves eight teams: Galway, who enter the championship at this stage, the Ulster runners-up and the defeated teams from the quarter-finals and semi-finals of the Leinster and Munster campaigns.  An open draw is made to determine the pairings, however, repeat games cannot take place.  Four teams are eliminated at this stage while the four winners advance to round 2.

Round 2: (3 matches) This round involves six teams: the defeated Leinster and Munster finalists and the four winners from round 1.  An open draw is made to determine the pairings, however, repeat games cannot take place.  Three teams are eliminated at this stage while the three winners advance to the All-Ireland quarter-finals.

All-Ireland Championship

Quarter-final: (2 matches) These are two lone games involving the Ulster champions and the three winners from round 2 of the qualifiers.   Two teams are eliminated at this stage while the two winning teams advance to the semi-finals.

Semi-finals: (2 matches) The winners of the two quarter-finals join the Leinster and Munster winners to make up the semi-final pairings.  The provincial champions are drawn in opposite semi-finals.  Two teams are eliminated at this stage while the two winning teams advance to the final.

Final: (1 match) The winners of the two semi-finals contest the All-Ireland final.

All-Ireland final

The new Qualifier system threw up an interesting pairing in the All-Ireland final.  It was the Leinster champions Kilkenny versus Clare, who were knocked out of the provincial championship in the very first round.  Kilkenny had the upper hand for the whole game as D.J. Carey and Henry Shefflin scored goals for Kilkenny.  Clare narrowed Kilkenny's lead in the second half, however, they missed two goal chances.  Kilkenny won the title for the 27th time.

Fixtures

Leinster Senior Hurling Championship

Munster Senior Hurling Championship

Ulster Senior Hurling Championship

Qualifiers

All-Ireland Senior Hurling Championship

Note: * = Provincial Champion

Top scorers

Season

Single game

All-Ireland Senior Hurling Championships
All-Ireland Senior Hurling Championship